Borgoratto Mormorolo is a comune (municipality) in the Province of Pavia in the Italian region Lombardy, located about 60 km south of Milan and about 30 km south of Pavia. As of 31 December 2004, it had a population of 415 and an area of 16.0 km².

Borgoratto Mormorolo borders the following municipalities: Borgo Priolo, Fortunago, Montalto Pavese, Ruino.

Demographic evolution

References

Cities and towns in Lombardy